Lunawa Purohitan is a village in Pali district, Rajasthan, India. The Village is located in the Aravalli of rajasthan.

Thakur Till Singhji Rajpurohit came all the from wakra bakra located in Jalore Rajasthan Lunawa has more than 30 temples to visit the most famous temple in lunawa is the Jaleri mata temple which is at the concer of the lunawa Talav also kanteshwar mahadev temple in lunawa is one of the famous and beautiful temple to visit this temple is located in the Aravalli hills of lunawa. 

Lunawa is one of the biggest village in Bali tehsil

References

External links
 Lunawa.com
 Population of Lunawa
 Lunawa Coordinates
 LunawaJanwaSamaj

Villages in Pali district